Thames Trains was a train operating company in the United Kingdom owned by Go-Ahead Group, which operated the Thames Trains franchise from October 1996 until March 2004.

History
The Thames Trains franchise was awarded by the Director of Passenger Rail Franchising to Victory Rail Holdings, a company owned by Go-Ahead (65%) and some ex-British Rail managers (35%), with operations commencing on 13 October 1996. Go-Ahead bought the remaining shares it did not own in June 1998.

The Ladbroke Grove rail crash of 5 October 1999 involved a Thames Trains Class 165, which had failed to stop at a red signal. Thames Trains was fined £2 million for violations of health and safety law in connection with the incident, and was also ordered to pay £75,000 in costs.

Services
Thames Trains ran services along the Great Western Main Line from London Paddington to Didcot with services continuing north to Oxford, Bicester Town, Hereford and Stratford-upon-Avon. It also operated services on the Greenford, Windsor & Eton Central, Marlow, Henley and Bedwyn lines and on the Reading to Basingstoke and North Downs lines.

In 1998 a service from Oxford to Bristol was introduced in partnership with First Great Western. This was withdrawn in 2003 to relieve congestion, at the request of the Strategic Rail Authority.

Rolling stock

Thames Trains inherited a fleet of near-new Class 165 and Class 166 diesel multiple units from British Rail. Because the paintwork was still under warranty, the existing Network SouthEast livery was retained with only a Thames Trains logo added. Upon the warranty expiring, a new livery of white, blue and green was introduced in 2000.

Depot
Thames Trains' fleet was maintained at Reading TMD.

Demise
In April 2003 the Strategic Rail Authority invited FirstGroup and Go-Ahead to bid for a two-year franchise that would coincide with the end date of the First Great Western franchise, after which both would become part of the Greater Western franchise. In November 2003 the Strategic Rail Authority awarded the new franchise to First with the services operated by Thames Trains transferring to First Great Western Link on 1 April 2004.

References

External links

Company website

 
 
 
 

Defunct train operating companies
Go-Ahead Group companies
Railway companies established in 1996
Railway companies disestablished in 2004
Railway operators in London
1996 establishments in England
2004 disestablishments in England
British companies established in 1996
British companies disestablished in 2004